Teenage Mutant Ninja Turtles, sometimes abbreviated to TMNT, is an American media franchise created by the comic book artists Kevin Eastman and Peter Laird. It follows Leonardo, Michelangelo, Donatello and Raphael, four anthropomorphic turtle brothers trained in ninjutsu who fight evil in New York City. Supporting characters include the turtles' rat sensei Splinter, their human friends April O'Neil and Casey Jones, and enemies such as Baxter Stockman, Krang, and their archenemy, the Shredder.

The franchise began as a comic book, Teenage Mutant Ninja Turtles, which Eastman and Laird conceived as a parody of elements popular in superhero comics at the time. The first issue was published in 1984 by Eastman and Laird's company Mirage Studios and was a surprise success. In 1987, Eastman and Laird licensed the characters to Playmates Toys, which developed a line of Turtles action figures. About US$1.1 billion of Turtles toys were sold between 1988 and 1992, making them the third-bestselling toy figures ever at the time.

The action figures were promoted with an animated series, which premiered in 1987 and ran for almost a decade. Three live-action films were released; the first, released in 1990, became the highest-grossing independent film up to that point. Numerous video games have also been released, including several developed by Konami. In some European regions, the franchise was titled Teenage Mutant Hero Turtles due to the violent connotations of the word "ninja".

Eastman sold his share of the Turtles franchise to Laird in 2000. In 2009, Laird sold it to Viacom, now Paramount Global. Viacom commissioned a new comic series, two new live-action films, and new animated series.

History

1983–1986: Conception and first comics 

The comic book authors Kevin Eastman and Peter Laird met in Massachusetts and began working on illustrations together. In 1983, Laird invited Eastman to move in with him in Dover, New Hampshire. That November, Eastman drew a masked turtle standing on its hind legs armed with nunchucks. Laird added the words "teenage mutant". The concept parodied several elements popular in superhero comics of the time: the teenagers of New Teen Titans, the mutants of Uncanny X-Men and the ninjas of Daredevil, combined with the comic tradition of funny animals such as Howard the Duck.

Eastman and Laird developed the concept into a comic book. They considered giving the turtles Japanese names, but instead named them after the Italian Renaissance artists Leonardo, Raphael, Donatello and Michelangelo, which Laird said "felt just quirky enough to fit the concept". They developed a backstory referencing further elements of Daredevil: like Daredevil, the Turtles are altered by radioactive material, and their sensei, Splinter, is a play on Daredevil's sensei, Stick.

In March 1984, Eastman and Laird founded a comic book company, Mirage Studios, in their home. Using money from a tax refund and a loan from Eastman's uncle, they printed copies of the first issue of Teenage Mutant Ninja Turtles and advertised it in Comics Buyer's Guide Magazine. This attracted the interest of comic distributors, and all 3,000 copies were sold in a few weeks. Sales of further issues continued to climb.

1987–1989: Toys, animation and video games 

In 1987, Eastman and Laird licensed Turtles to Playmates Toys. Between 1988 and 1997, Playmates produced Turtles toys including around 400 figures and dozens of vehicles and playsets. About US$1.1 billion of Turtles toys were sold in four years, making them the third-bestselling toy figures ever at the time, behind GI Joe and Star Wars.

Influenced by the success of He-Man, G.I. Joe and Transformers, which had promoted toy lines with animated series, Playmates worked with the animation studio Murakami-Wolf-Swenson to produce the first Turtles animated series, which premiered in 1987 and ran for almost a decade. It introduced Turtles elements such as their color-coded masks, catchphrases, love of pizza and distinct personalities. To make it acceptable to parents and television networks, the series had a lighter tone than the comics, with no expletives, less violence and less threatening villains. In the United Kingdom and some other European regions, the franchise was renamed Teenage Mutant Hero Turtles for the violent connotations of the word "ninja".

The first Turtles video game was released for the Nintendo Entertainment System (NES) in 1989, the first of several developed by the Japanese company Konami. It sold approximately four million copies, making it one of the bestselling NES games. In response to concerns that the series was drifting from its origins, Eastman and Laird published an editorial in the comic in 1989, writing: "We've allowed the wacky side to happen, and enjoy it very much. All the while, though, we've kept the originals very much ours." Eastman later said there was "some stuff that we wish we hadn’t said yes to", and Laird wrote of his dislike for the softer tone of the animated series.

1990s: First films, franchise expansion and commercial peak 
The early 1990s saw the commercial peak of the franchise. The first Turtles film was released in 1990, featuring costumes designed by Jim Henson's Creature Shop. It was based more closely on the comic than the animated series, with a darker tone. It was the fourth-highest-grossing film of 1990 and the highest-grossing independent film at that point, earning more than US$200 million worldwide. A sequel, The Secret of the Ooze, was released the following year. With a rushed production and a lighter tone, it received weaker reviews and was less successful at the box office. Teenage Mutant Ninja Turtles III (1993) was aimed at the Japanese market, the largest foreign market for US films at the time, but failed to see release there and saw weaker reviews and sales.

In 1990, a stage musical, Coming Out of Their Shells, featuring the Turtles as a rock band, played 40 shows across the United States. The musical was sponsored by Pizza Hut and promoted with an appearance on The Oprah Winfrey Show. A soundtrack album and VHS were released. After the animated series ended, a live-action television series, Ninja Turtles: The Next Mutation, was created in 1997 with Saban Entertainment. It introduced a fifth, female turtle, Venus de Milo. The series was canceled after one season; Laird later said it was the only licensed Turtles project he "truly regrets".

2000s–present: Sale to Nickelodeon and further series 
Eastman sold his share of the Turtles franchise to Laird in 2000. In 2003, 4Kids Entertainment launched a new animated Turtles series, which ran for seven seasons, concluding with a television film Turtles Forever in 2009. Laird had a role in the production, creating a closer adaptation of the original comic.  A computer-animated Turtles film, TMNT, was released in 2007 and earned $95 million at the box office.

On October 21, 2009, it was announced that Laird had sold the franchise to Viacom. He said he had tired of working on Turtles, writing: "I am no longer that guy who carries his sketchbook around with him and draws in it every chance he gets." In August 2011, IDW Publishing launched a new Turtles comic series, with Eastman as co-writer and illustrator.  A third animated series premiered in September 2012 on Nickelodeon, and ran for five seasons before ending in 2017.

A fourth live-action Turtles film, produced by Platinum Dunes, Nickelodeon Movies, and Paramount Pictures, directed by Jonathan Liebesman and produced by Michael Bay, was released on August 8, 2014. It received negative reviews, but was a box-office success. A sequel, Out of the Shadows, directed by Dave Green, was released in June 2016.

A fourth animated series, Rise of the Teenage Mutant Ninja Turtles, premiered in 2018 and ran for two seasons. A film sequel to the series released in 2022 on the streaming service Netflix. In 2021, Deadline Hollywood reported that a live-action reboot produced by Bay was in development. Mutant Mayhem, an animated film produced by Seth Rogen, is scheduled for theatrical release in August 2023.

Characters 

In most versions, the Teenage Mutant Ninja Turtles are created when four baby turtles are exposed to radioactive ooze, transforming them into humanoids. They fight evil in New York City, where they reside in the sewers.

Leonardo, the leader, is the most disciplined and skilled turtle; an expert swordsman, he wields two katana and wears a blue bandana. Raphael, the strongest and most hot-headed turtle, wears a red bandana and uses a pair of sai. Donatello uses his intellect to invent gadgets and vehicles; he wears a purple mask and uses a bo staff. Michelangelo is the least disciplined and most fun-loving turtle, and is usually portrayed as the fastest and most agile. He wears an orange bandana and uses nunchucks.

Splinter is a mutant rat who is the wise adoptive father of the Turtles and teaches them ninjitsu. In some iterations, he was once the pet rat of ninja master Hamato Yoshi; in others, he is a mutated Yoshi. The Turtles are assisted by April O'Neil, who is variously depicted as a news reporter, lab assistant or genius computer programmer. In most versions, she is pursued romantically by Casey Jones, a hockey mask-wearing vigilante who usually becomes an ally of the Turtles.

The Turtles' nemesis is the Shredder, who leads the criminal ninja clan known as the Foot. His real identity is usually the ninja Oroku Saki. In most versions, the Shredder's second in command is Karai, a skilled martial artist; in some iterations she is the Shredder's daughter. The Shredder allies with Baxter Stockman, a mad scientist, and Krang, an alien warlord. Krang was introduced in the original animated series, and was inspired by the Utrom race from the comics. Also created for the series were the Shredder's buffoonish henchmen, Bebop and Rocksteady, a mutant rhinoceros and warthog.

Comics

Mirage Studios (1984–2014) 

Eastman and Laird's Teenage Mutant Ninja Turtles premiered in May 1984, at a comic book convention held at a local Sheraton Hotel in Portsmouth, New Hampshire. It was published by their company Mirage Studios in an oversized magazine-style format using black and white artwork on cheap newsprint, limited to a print run of 3000 copies. It was initially intended as a one-shot, but due to its popularity it became an ongoing series.

After publication was temporarily assumed by Image Comics for the third volume (see below), Laird (by then the sole owner of the franchise) and Lawson relaunched the main series at Mirage with a fourth volume in 2001. Following the sale of the franchise to Nickelodeon in late 2009, Laird retained the right to continue the Mirage series, but no issues have been released since the release of No. 32 in 2014, and Mirage Studios was wound down in 2021.

All total, the main Mirage series lasted for 129 issues, spanning four separate volumes of 62, 13, 23, and 32 issues, respectively. Additional one-shot issues and miniseries were published over the years. Mirage also published a companion book entitled Tales of the Teenage Mutant Ninja Turtles, which was designed to fill in the gaps of continuity in the TMNT universe.

Image Comics (1996–1999) 
In 1996, Image Comics co-founder Erik Larsen, seeing they there were no TMNT comics in active publication, oversaw a relaunch of the comics through Highbrow Productions, his studio at Image, with writing by Gary Carlson and art by Frank Fosco. This third volume of the main series, intended as a continuation of the Mirage comics, saw Splinter become a bat, Donatello a cyborg, Leonardo lose a hand and Raphael become scarred and assume the identity of the new Shredder. The series was canceled in 1999 after 23 issues without a conclusion. In 2018, IDW began reprinting the series in full color as Teenage Mutant Ninja Turtles: Urban Legends, and commissioned Carlson and Fusco to create three additional issues to tie up the unfinished story.

Archie Comics (1988–1995) 

From 1988 to 1995, Archie Comics published Teenage Mutant Ninja Turtles Adventures, a series aimed at a younger audience. Initially adapting episodes of the first animated series, it soon moved to original storylines. The main series ran for 72 issues; in addition, there were numerous annuals, specials and miniseries. An ongoing spinoff series, Mighty Mutanimals, features a team of supporting characters.

Dreamwave Productions (2003)

A monthly comic inspired by the 2003 TV series was published by Dreamwave Productions from June to December 2003. It was written by Peter David and illustrated by LeSean Thomas. In the first four issues, which were the only ones directly adapted from the TV series, the story was told from the perspectives of April, Baxter, Casey, and a pair of New York City police officers.

IDW Publishing (2011–present) 

In 2011, IDW Publishing acquired the license to publish new collections of Mirage storylines and a new ongoing series. The first issue of the new series was released in August of that year. Eastman and Tom Waltz wrote the book, with Eastman and Dan Duncan providing art. In 2017 issue No. 73 of the comic was published, making it the longest running comic series in the franchises history. In addition to the main series and spin-offs set within its continuity, IDW also published comics based on the 2012 Turtles animated series and the 2018 animated series, Rise of the Teenage Mutant Ninja Turtles.

Manga
The Turtles have appeared in several manga series.
 is a 15-issue series by Tsutomu Oyamada, Zuki mora, and Yoshimi Hamada that simply adapted episodes of the original American animated series.
Super Turtles (スーパータートルズ Sūpā Tātoruzu) is a three-issue miniseries by Hidemasa Idemitsu, Tetsurō Kawade, and Toshio Kudō that featured the "TMNT Supermutants" Turtle toys that were on sale at the time. The first volume of the anime miniseries followed this storyline.
 by Hiroshi Kanno is a reinterpretation of the Turtles story with no connection to the previous manga.
 is Yasuhiko Hachino's adaptation of the third feature film.
 is a 1995 series by Ogata Nobu which ran in Comic BomBom.
 is a continuation of the 1995 series when it continued to run through 1996.

Comic strip

A daily comic strip written and illustrated by Dan Berger began in 1990. It featured an adventure story Monday through Friday and activity puzzles on weekends (with fan art appearing later). The comic strip was published in syndication until its cancellation in December 1996. At its highest point in popularity, it was published in more than 250 newspapers.

Television series

First animated series (1987–1996) 

Debuting in 1987 as a five-part miniseries and becoming a regular Saturday-morning syndicated series on October 1, 1988, the first animated series follows the adventures of the Teenage Mutant Ninja Turtles and their allies as they battle the Shredder, Krang, and numerous other villains and criminals in New York City. The property was changed considerably from the darker-toned comics, to make it more suitable for children and the families. Produced by Fred Wolf Films, the series ran for ten seasons and ended in 1996.

Original video animation 

In addition to the American series, a Japan-exclusive two-episode anime original video animation (OVA) series was made in 1996, titled Mutant Turtles: Choujin Densetsu-hen. The OVA is similar in tone to the 1987 TV series and uses the same voices from TV Tokyo's Japanese dub of the 1987 TV series. It featured the Turtles as superheroes, that gained costumes and superpowers with the use of Mutastones, while Shredder, Bebop and Rocksteady gained supervillain powers with the use of a Dark Mutastone.

Live-action series (1997–1998) 

In 1997–1998, a live-action series, Ninja Turtles: The Next Mutation, aired on Fox. It introduced a female turtle, Venus de Milo, skilled in the mystical arts of the shinobi. The Next Mutation Turtles made a guest appearance on Power Rangers in Space. The Next Mutation was canceled after one season of 26 episodes.

Second animated series (2003–2009) 

In 2003, a new TMNT series produced by 4Kids Entertainment began airing on the "FoxBox" (later renamed "4Kids TV") programming block. It later moved to "The CW4Kids" block. The series was co-produced by Mirage Studios, and Mirage owned one-third of the rights to the series. Mirage's significant stake in creative control resulted in a cartoon that hews more closely to the original comics, creating a darker and mature tone than the 1987 cartoon, though still considered appropriate for younger viewers. This series lasted until 2009, ending with a feature-length television movie titled Turtles Forever, which was produced in conjunction with the 25th anniversary of the franchise.

Third animated series (2012–2017) 

Nickelodeon acquired the global rights to Teenage Mutant Ninja Turtles from the Mirage Group and 4Kids Entertainment, Inc. and announced a new CGI-animated TMNT television series. The 2012 version is characterized by anime-like iconography and emphasis on mutagen continuing to wreak havoc on the everyday lives of the Turtles and their enemies; in addition, the tone of this version is similar to the original series, but also features a handful of serious episodes as well. The series ran for five seasons and ended in 2017.

Fourth animated series (2018–2020) 

Rise of the Teenage Mutant Ninja Turtles was the second Nickelodeon-produced animated series in the franchise and premiered in September 2018. It returned to using 2D animation, while also using some anime iconography, and was characterized by its lighter humor. The series aired between 2018 and 2020, and was followed by a feature film released on Netflix in 2022.

Films

The Turtles have starred in six theatrical feature films. The first three are live-action features produced in the early 1990s: Teenage Mutant Ninja Turtles (1990), Teenage Mutant Ninja Turtles II: The Secret of the Ooze (1991), and Teenage Mutant Ninja Turtles III (1993). The Turtles were played by various actors in costumes featuring animatronic heads, initially produced by Jim Henson's Creature Shop. The fourth film, a computer-animated film titled TMNT, was released in 2007.

A reboot, also titled Teenage Mutant Ninja Turtles produced by Platinum Dunes, Nickelodeon Movies, and Paramount Pictures was released in 2014. A sequel titled Teenage Mutant Ninja Turtles: Out of the Shadows was released in 2016. A computer-animated reboot titled Teenage Mutant Ninja Turtles: Mutant Mayhem is set to release in 2023.

Merchandise
By May 1990, it had generated  in domestic retail revenues.

Toys

During the run of the 1987 TV series, Playmates Toys produced hundreds of TMNT action figures, along with vehicles, playsets, and accessories, becoming one of the top collectibles for children. Staff artists at Northampton, Massachusetts-based Mirage Studios provided conceptual designs for many of the figures, vehicles, and playsets and creator credit can be found in the legal text printed on the back of the toy packaging. In addition, Playmates produced a series of TMNT/Star Trek crossover figures, due to Playmates holding the Star Trek action-figure license at the time. Playmates employed many design groups to develop looks and styles for the toy line, including Bloom Design, White Design, Pangea, Robinson-Clarke, and McHale Design. The marketing vice president of Playmates, Karl Aaronian, was largely responsible for assembling the talented team of designers and writers, which in turn, helped germinate continued interest in the toy line.

Never before in toy history did an action-figure line have such an impact for over two decades, generating billions of dollars in licensing revenue. The series was highly popular in the UK, where in the run-up to Christmas, the Army & Navy Store in London's Lewisham devoted its entire basement to everything Turtle, including games, videos, costumes, and other items. Playmates continued to produce TMNT action figures based on the 2003 animated series. The 2007 film TMNT also gave Playmates a new source from which to make figures, while National Entertainment Collectibles Association produced a series of high-quality action figures based on character designs from the original Mirage comics. In 2012, a new toy line and a new classic toy line from Playmates were announced to be released.

Video games

A number of TMNT video games had been produced, mostly by Konami. The first console video game based on the franchise, Teenage Mutant Ninja Turtles, was released for the Nintendo Entertainment System (NES) under Konami's "Ultra Games" label in 1989 and later ported to home computers and eventually for the Wii on the Virtual Console. Also released by Konami in 1989 was an arcade game, also titled simply Teenage Mutant Ninja Turtles, later ported to the NES as Teenage Mutant Ninja Turtles II: The Arcade Game, leading to an NES-only sequel, Teenage Mutant Ninja Turtles III: The Manhattan Project, with gameplay taken from the arcade game, as opposed to the first NES game. The next Turtles game, Teenage Mutant Ninja Turtles: Turtles in Time, was released in 1991 as an arcade game, and was later ported to the Super Nintendo Entertainment System (Super NES) in 1992, titled Teenage Mutant Ninja Turtles IV: Turtles in Time, with a sequel numbering to the NES titles appended. Teenage Mutant Ninja Turtles: The Hyperstone Heist was also created for the Sega Genesis in the same year, and used many of the art assets from TMNT IV.

There was also a trilogy of TMNT video games for the original Game Boy system made by Konami, consisting of Teenage Mutant Ninja Turtles: Fall of the Foot Clan, Teenage Mutant Ninja Turtles II: Back from the Sewers, and Teenage Mutant Ninja Turtles III: Radical Rescue. A PC-exclusive game, Teenage Mutant Ninja Turtles: Manhattan Missions was also released. Konami's last entries during the original run were Teenage Mutant Ninja Turtles: Tournament Fighters, a set of one-on-one fighting game released for the NES, SNES, and Genesis; each version is a wholly distinct game, sharing only the title and genre in common.

In September 2002, Konami also acquired the license to adapt the 2003 TV series into a video game franchise, resulting in a new series of games with 3D gameplay inspired by the old TMNT beat 'em up games, consisting of Teenage Mutant Ninja Turtles (2003 video game), Teenage Mutant Ninja Turtles 2: Battle Nexus, Teenage Mutant Ninja Turtles 3: Mutant Nightmare, and Teenage Mutant Ninja Turtles: Mutant Melee.

In 2006, Ubisoft acquired the rights for TMNT games, beginning with a game based on the 2007 animated feature film, along with a distinct game for the Game Boy Advance similar in style to the Konami arcade games. A beat 'em up game Teenage Mutant Ninja Turtles: Arcade Attack was released for the Nintendo DS in 2009, to coincide with the series' 25th anniversary.

In 2013, Activision released the downloadable game Teenage Mutant Ninja Turtles: Out of the Shadows, based on the 2012 TV series and developed by Red Fly Studio for the Xbox Live Arcade, PlayStation Network and Steam.

In 2016, Activision and PlatinumGames developed Teenage Mutant Ninja Turtles: Mutants in Manhattan for the PlayStation 4, PlayStation 3, Xbox One, Xbox 360, and PC. The game is described as a third-person, team-based brawler. The campaign is playable either single-player or co-op and has an original story written by Tom Waltz, IDW comic writer and editor. The art style is based on long time TMNT comic artist Mateus Santolouco.

Teenage Mutant Ninja Turtles Legends, a free-to-play Role-playing video game was released by Ludia in summer 2016 for iPhone, iPad, Android, and Kindle Fire. It is based on the 2012 TV series.

The Teenage Mutant Ninja Turtles appear as playable characters in the DC Comics fighting game Injustice 2 as a part of the "Fighter Pack 3" DLC, with Corey Krueger, Joe Brugie, Ben Rausch and Ryan Cooper voicing their roles.

Leonardo, Michelangelo, April O'Neil and Shredder appear as playable characters in the 2021 platform fighting game Nickelodeon All-Star Brawl, with Cam Clarke, Townsend Coleman and Jim Cummings reprising their roles from the 1987 animated series while Abby Trott voices the role as part of the June 2022 update of the game. All four of the Teenage Mutant Ninja Turtles also appeared as playable characters in the fighting game Brawlhalla.

Teenage Mutant Ninja Turtles: Shredder's Revenge, a beat 'em up with all four Teenage Mutant Ninja Turtles, April, Splinter and Casey Jones as playable characters was released in June 2022. It is inspired by the 1987 Turtles animated series and borrows stylistically from the arcade and home console games, developed by Konami during the 80s and 90s.

In other media

Tabletop role playing game
In 1985, Palladium Books published Teenage Mutant Ninja Turtles & Other Strangeness. It is a standalone game, but uses the  many key mechanics from Palladium's Megaversal system and is compatible with material from other Palladium games. It introduced rules for creating anthropomorphic animal mutants. Examples of mutants are included in the appendices as potential antagonists, including the Terror Bears, Caesars Weasels, and Sparrow Eagles, as well as including stats for the Turtles and other characters. A series of supplements were released over the next few years, which remained in print until, due to the cost of maintaining the license, Palladium decided to end its license with Mirage Studios in January 2000.

Food tie-ins

During the height of their popularity, the Turtles had a number of food tie-ins. Among the most notable of these products was Ninja Turtles Cereal, produced by Ralston-Purina as a kind of "Chex with TMNT-themed marshmallows." The cereal featured many different in-box premiums during its production run. Ralston also produced Pizza Crunchabungas, which were pizza-flavored corn snacks in the shape of whole, circular pizzas (the commercial starred the Ninja Turtles as Will Vinton-created claymations); Hostess Teenage Mutant Ninja Turtles Pies, featuring a crust covered in green glaze with vanilla pudding inside. Each pie came with either one of five yellow stickers with an illustration of one of the turtles on it, or one of 5 different TMNT II: Secret of the Ooze trading cards inside.

There were also four TMNT mail away items available to order from Hostess and Royal OOZE Gelatin Desserts, distributed by Nabisco under "Royal Gelatin" in three different flavors: orange, strawberry, and lime. Shreddies was a Canadian cereal with TMNT-themed box art and promos. One example of a TMNT prize was rings featuring a character from the cartoon (1992). Chef Boyardee also released a canned pasta with the pasta in the shapes of the four turtles. There were multiple versions of the pasta released, including one with Shredder added into the shapes. Customers could mail away for an exclusive Shredder action figure that was darker than the standard Playmates figure, it was shipped in a plastic baggy. This Shredder is one of the more valuable TMNT action figures today.

Concert tour
To capitalize on the Turtles' popularity, a concert tour was held in 1990, premiering at Radio City Music Hall on August 17. The "Coming Out of Their Shells" tour featured live-action turtles playing music as a band (Donatello on keyboards; Leonardo on bass guitar; Raphael on drums and saxophone; and Michelangelo on guitar) on stage around a familiar plotline: April O'Neil is kidnapped by the Shredder, and the Turtles have to rescue her. The story had a very Bill & Ted-esque feel, with its theme of the power of rock n' roll literally defeating the enemy, in the form of the Shredder (who only rapped about how he hates music) trying to eliminate all music. A pay-per-view special highlighting the concert was shown, and a studio album was also released.

The tour was sponsored by Pizza Hut; thus, many references are made to their pizza. Empty Pizza Hut boxes are seen onscreen in the "Behind the Shells" VHS. As part of a cross-marketing strategy, Pizza Hut restaurants gave away posters, audio cassettes of "Coming Out of Their Shells", and "Official Tour Guides" as premiums. The first show of the tour was released on video with a making of video also released. The song "Pizza Power" was later used by Konami for the second arcade game Teenage Mutant Ninja Turtles: Turtles in Time. Cam Clarke and Peter Renaday reprised their roles as Leonardo and Splinter during spoken portions of the concert's kickoff event in Radio City Music Hall, though they went uncredited in the event's VHS release.

Roller coasters and amusement rides
Nickelodeon Universe at American Dream Meadowlands in East Rutherford, New Jersey, which opened in 2019, contains several TMNT themed rides, including two coasters that broke world records upon their opening. The TMNT Shellraiser, a Gerstlauer Euro-Fighter, is the steepest roller coaster in the world at 121.5 degrees.

Nickelodeon Universe at Mall of America in Bloomington, Minnesota, also contains rides themed to the TMNT franchise. These include Teenage Mutant Ninja Turtles Shell Shock, a roller coaster that opened in 2012, and Shredder's Mutant Masher, a pendulum ride that opened in 2015.

Parodies

Although the TMNT had originated as something of a parody, the comic's explosive success led to a wave of small-press, black and white comic parodies of TMNT itself, including Adolescent Radioactive Black Belt Hamsters, Pre-Teen Dirty-Gene Kung-Fu Kangaroos, and a host of others. Dark Horse Comics' Boris the Bear was launched in response to these TMNT clones; its first issue was titled "Boris the Bear Slaughters the Teenage Radioactive Black Belt Mutant Ninja Critters". Once the Turtles broke into the mainstream, parodies also proliferated in other media, such as in satire magazines Cracked and Mad and numerous TV series of the period. The satirical British television series Spitting Image featured a recurring sketch "Teenage Mutant Ninja Turds".

See also

List of animal superheroes
Ninjas in popular culture

References

Bibliography
Eastman, Kevin (2002). Kevin Eastman's Teenage Mutant Ninja Turtles Artobiography. Los Angeles: Heavy Metal. .
Wiater, Stanley (1991). The Official Teenage Mutant Ninja Turtles Treasury. New York: Villard. .

External links 

 Teenage Mutant Ninja Turtles at Don Markstein's Toonopedia

 
1984 comics debuts
American comics adapted into films
Animal superheroes
Anthropomorphic reptiles
Comic martial artists
Comics adapted into animated films
Comics adapted into animated series
Comics adapted into television series
Comics adapted into video games
Comics characters introduced in 1984
Comics superheroes
Fictional characters from New York City
Fictional human–animal hybrids
Fictional male martial artists
Fictional mutants
Fictional ninja
Fictional quartets
Fictional turtles
Fighting game characters
Film superheroes
Image Comics superhero teams
Japan in non-Japanese culture
Male superheroes
Martial artist characters in films
Martial artist characters in television
Mirage Studios titles
New York City in fiction
Nickelodeon
Ninja parody
Paramount Global franchises
Science fantasy franchises
Superhero franchises
Superhero teams
Teenage superheroes
Television superheroes
Vigilante characters in comics